Fatih Keleş (born 27 November 1989 in Trabzon, Turkey) is a European champion Turkish amateur boxer competing in the lightweight division. He is a member of the Kocaeli BB Kağıt S.K. in Izmit. He is coached by Nazmi Dalkıran.

Early life
He was born on 27 November 1989 in Trabzon. Fatih married at the age of 17. He and his wife Fatma have a son, Kaan Berk, and a baby girl, Eylem Banu. He is a student of physical education and sports at the Black Sea Technical University.

Amateur career
Fatih Keleş began boxing with ten years of age. His brother is also an amateur boxer.

He won the gold medal at the 2011 European Amateur Championships held in Ankara, Turkey. He took part in the 2012 Summer Olympics. At the 2013 Mediterranean Games held in Mersin, Turkey, he became silver medalist.

Professional boxing record

References

1989 births
Sportspeople from Trabzon
Karadeniz Technical University alumni
Living people
Lightweight boxers
Kocaeli Büyükşehir Belediyesi Kağıt Spor boxers
Olympic boxers of Turkey
Boxers at the 2012 Summer Olympics
Turkish male boxers
European champions for Turkey
Mediterranean Games silver medalists for Turkey
Competitors at the 2013 Mediterranean Games
Mediterranean Games medalists in boxing